Megachile mendozana is a species of bee in the family Megachilidae. It was described by Theodore Dru Alison Cockerell in 1907.

References

Mendozana
Insects described in 1907